Conrow Glacier is a small glacier, next westward of Bartley Glacier, that drains north from the Asgard Range partway down the south wall of Wright Valley, Victoria Land, Antarctica. It was named by Roy E. Cameron, leader of a United States Antarctic Research Program biological party to the area in 1966–67, for Howard P. Conrow, a member of that party.

References
 

Glaciers of the Asgard Range
Glaciers of McMurdo Dry Valleys